Dougal Howard (born 25 March 1996) is a professional Australian rules footballer playing for the St Kilda Football Club in the Australian Football League (AFL). Formerly playing for Port Adelaide, which recruited him with pick 56 in the 2014 national draft, he was traded to St Kilda at the end of the 2019 season. Howard is currently the Saints' vice-captain.

AFL career

Port Adelaide 
Howard made his debut in the first Showdown of the 2016 AFL season at Adelaide Oval. Howard played only three games until an anterior cruciate ligament injury ended his season prematurely.

Howard played 20 games in the 2018 AFL season, only missing two games with a broken hand. He played some impressive shut-down jobs on the league's best forwards and lead the competition for one-percenters with 230. He signed a three-year contract extension with  until the end of 2022. In 2019, Howard captained Port Adelaide in the club's round 9, 38-point win against Gold Coast at Adelaide Oval. After the game, coach Ken Hinkley said of Howard that "we absolutely believe that Dougal's an emerging leader of our football club ... We saw an occasional mistake, we saw some really impressive stuff, we saw a willingness to take the game on – that's what you want from a young leader, that's not to let it burden him."

St Kilda 

At the conclusion of the 2019 AFL season, Howard requested a trade to St Kilda. The trade was finalised on 15 October and Howard was traded to St Kilda along with Port teammate Paddy Ryder and pick 10 and a 2020 fourth-round selection, in return for the Saints' picks 12 and 18 and a 2020 third-round selection. Howard also attracted attention from North Melbourne and Essendon but ultimately chose St Kilda. Before moving to the Saints, Howard was told at his exit interview that Port saw his future as a forward rather than a defender. A week after the exit interview, Port Adelaide list manager Jason Cripps suggested that a trade could be an option for Howard, who ultimately explored his options and eventually requested a move to St Kilda.

Howard played every game in defence in his first season at St Kilda, which ultimately resulted in the club's first finals berth since 2011. He was subsequently named St Kilda's vice-captain ahead of the 2021 AFL season.

In round 2 of the 2021 season, Howard was one of the best in the Saints' loss to Melbourne, collecting 29 disposals, eight marks, nine intercept possessions, nine rebound 50s, four score involvements and gained 769 metres (most on ground).Howard finished seventh in the Trevor Barker Award in 2021.

Statistics
 Statistics are correct to the end of the 2021 season

|- style="background-color: #EAEAEA"
! scope="row" style="text-align:center" | 2016
|
| 32 || 6 || 3 || 4 || 30 || 20 || 50 || 14 || 17 || 0.50 || 0.67 || 5.00 || 3.33 || 8.33 || 2.33 || 2.83
|- style="background-color: #EAEAEA"
! scope="row" style="text-align:center" | 2017
|
| 32 || 4 || 1 || 0 || 43 || 12 || 55 || 27 || 3 || 0.25 || 0 || 10.75 || 3.00 || 13.75 || 6.75 || 0.75
|- style="background-color: #EAEAEA"
! scope="row" style="text-align:center" | 2018
|
| 32 || 20 || 0 || 0 || 158 || 60 || 218 || 40000 || 29 || 0.0 || 0.0 || 7.90 || 3.00 || 10.90 || 4.35 || 1.45
|- style="background-color: #EAEAEA"
! scope="row" style="text-align:center" | 2019
|
| 32 || 15 || 10 || 6 || 114 || 60 || 174 || 67 || 22 || 0.67 || 0.40 || 7.60 || 4.00 || 11.60 || 4.47 || 1.47
|- style="background-color: #EAEAEA"
! scope="row" style="text-align:center" | 2020
|
| 20 || 18 || 1 || 1 || 151 || 34 || 185 || 74 || 22 || 0.10 || 0.10 || 8.40 || 1.90 || 10.30 || 1.60 || 1.20
|- style="background-color: #EAEAEA"
! scope="row" style="text-align:center" | 2021
|
| 20 || 21 || 0 || 1 || 256 || 68 || 324 || 102 || 25 || 0.0 || 0.05 || 12.19 || 3.24 || 15.43 || 4.86 || 1.19
|- class="sortbottom"
! colspan=3| Career
! 85
! 15
! 12
! 760
! 258
! 1018
! 373
! 119
! 0.18
! 0.14
! 8.64
! 3.04
! 11.98
! 4.39
! 1.40
|}

Notes

References

External links

Australian rules footballers from Victoria (Australia)
1996 births
Living people
Port Adelaide Football Club players
Port Adelaide Football Club players (all competitions)
Murray Bushrangers players
St Kilda Football Club players
Sportspeople from Wagga Wagga